Matthew L. Lesser is an American politician who represents the 9th district in the Connecticut State Senate. First elected to the State House in 2008, Lesser was re-elected in 2010, 2012, 2014, and 2016. In 2018 he was elected as state senator for the 9th district, winning 57% of the vote.

Political career

Early years
In 2006, Lesser, as a full-time student at Wesleyan University and President of the College Democrats of Connecticut, organized the largest student voter mobilization drive in the country.

Lesser was elected as Chairman of the Middletown Planning and Zoning Commission.

State House
On May 20, 2008, Lesser, then a student at Wesleyan University, was selected to run as the second youngest candidate for State Representative at the Democratic 100th District Convention. Lesser received the endorsement of then-Connecticut Secretary of State Susan Bysiewicz, who once held the 100th District State representative seat. Lesser also received support from State Senator Tom Gaffey and Middletown DTC Chairman Dan Russo. Lesser defeated three-term incumbent Ray Kalinowski.

In the state House, Lesser served as the chairman of the Banking Committee. Additionally, he sat on the Government Administration and Elections and Insurance and Real Estate Committees.

Since taking office in 2009, Lesser has written and passed a number of laws, including Connecticut's first in the nation Student Loan Bill of Rights, an act prohibiting fracking waste from being dumped in Connecticut, and updated workplace safety standards. An advocate of voting rights, Lesser considered running for Connecticut secretary of state in 2018 and formed an exploratory committee, but said he would only run if Denise W. Merrill did not seek election.

In 2012, Lesser was elected to the Democratic Party's National Platform Committee.

State Senate
Lesser announced a run for state senator in May 2018. He won the August 2018 primary against former state representative Antonio Guerrera. The general election featured some controversy when the campaign of Republican candidate Ed Charamut sent our a mailer to voters attacking Lesser, featuring an altered image of Lesser clutching $100 bills; the mailer garnered national media attention and was denounced for its use of antisemitic tropes. Lesser won the general election in November and was appointed as Senate Chairman of the Insurance and Real Estate Committee in the following month.

As a state senator, Lesser has written laws to guarantee mental health parity, expand access to epinephrine devices and EpiPens in public venues, and to cap the cost of insulin at $25, the lowest such cap in the United States. During the COVID-19 pandemic, Lesser wrote a law expanding access to telehealth.

During the 2019 legislative session, Lesser championed a health care reform effort to create a public health insurance option in the state of Connecticut (dubbed "the Connecticut Option").  He overseeing the bill from his position as Co-Chair when it passed out of the Insurance and Real Estate Committee. The bill also passed the House Appropriations Committee on a 29–19 vote. The effort ultimately failed amid opposition from health insurers.

Personal life
Lesser lives in Middletown's North End with his wife Sarah, their son, and their dog Lucy.

Electoral history

References

External links
Lesser's Official Website

1983 births
21st-century American Jews
21st-century American politicians
Democratic Party Connecticut state senators
Jewish American state legislators in Connecticut
Living people
Democratic Party members of the Connecticut House of Representatives
Politicians from Middletown, Connecticut
Wesleyan University alumni